Ralph Humphrey (April 14, 1932 – July 14, 1990) was an American abstract painter whose work has been linked to both Abstract Expressionism and Minimalism. He was active in the New York art scene in the 1960s and '70s. His paintings are best summarized as an exploration of space through color and structure. He lived and worked in New York, NY.

He is not to be confused with the percussionist Ralph Humphrey, best known for being the drummer of The Mothers Of Invention from 1973 until 1974.

Biography
Ralph Humphrey studied at Youngstown State University. He moved to New York in 1957 and immediately became a part of the art scene that was known, at the time, for Abstract Expressionism. He met artists such as Mark Rothko, Theodoros Stamos, Frank Stella, Robert Ryman, and Ellsworth Kelly, who would end up having a large influence on his work. Humphrey was a prominent member of the generation of artists who laid the groundwork for American art in the 1970s and 60s. From 1966 until his death in 1990, he taught painting in the graduate department at Hunter College.

Artistic style
Humphrey's artistic style went through several phases and developments, which can be roughly outlined in the following way: monochromes from 1957 to 1960; frame paintings 1961–65; shaped canvases 1967–70; constructed paintings 1971–1990. Throughout these phases, Humphrey kept a keen eye on color, light, and space while he moved between abstraction and representation. As Kenneth Baker explains in Art in America in 1984, “Each of his works defines an ideal viewing distance that can be discovered only by patient observation of the focus of the details, the resolution of the image and the proper relationship between body and object. Finding the apt distance from which to contemplate Humphrey’s new paints is thus not something you do discursively: it is an exercise in feeling your way silently towards a correct spatial interval.”

1957–1960
Reviewing Humphrey's show at Tibor de Nagy in 1960, Donald Judd said, of his monochromes, “They are large, subtle and single-colored. This is Purism of a sort, in which generality does not contain variables but excludes them, in which the basic diagram or color, the only continuity, is exposed, here the essence of a confused sequence of perceptions.” Donald Judd also likened these canvases to the work of Kazimir Malevich, Piet Mondrian, and Josef Albers.

1961–1965
Neil A. Levine wrote in 1965 about Humphrey's solo exhibition at Green Gallery, where he showed some of his frame paintings. Levine said, “His new work is serious and demanding. All the paintings are variations on one theme. The theme is, simply stated, an expansive, lightly brushed, large grey field…surrounded by a painted framing edge…” Here, Neil, too, references Albers, as well as TV screens, unfilled billboards, and Rothko.

1967–1970
Robert Pincus-Whitten reviewed Humphrey's 1969 show at Bykert Gallery, where his shaped canvases were hung. Pincus-Whitten explains how Humphrey created “a luminous cosmos of fragile exhalations, painted on large squares or horizontal rectangles, softly turned at the corner and curved back into the stretcher.” These canvases are noteworthy, too, for their use of day-glow colors. At this time, his work becomes increasingly more atmospheric than his previous efforts; multi-colored wavy lines and sprayed colors replace solid geometric fields of single colors.

1971–1990
The last definable phase of his artistic style approaches representation at times, sometimes calling to mind an open window. These constructed paintings also border on sculpture, often coming ten inches out from the wall, directly confronting the viewer in real space. The paint, too, is considerably built up, giving the surface of the paintings considerable texture that was not previously seen in his work. Ellen Schwartz writes in 1977 about his show at John Weber, where his constructed paintings were still abstract: “Humphrey’s latest works, meditative rather than communicative, require the suspension of conscious efforts to grasp them before they will yield their secrets, which lay within ourselves all the while. The rich blue variegated surfaces are like blotters onto which we pour our own fantasies.” D Phillips, writing about his Willard Gallery show in 1982, explains how his constructed paintings are natural extensions of the earlier frame paintings: “Frames-within-frames have long provided the structural basis for Humphrey’s colorful designs; he has simply made his window allusion literal.” She explains, too, that these paintings are a step forward: “The shift does, however, bring greater variety and complexity to the artist’s constructions. There is a more explicit sense of space, of indoors and outdoors.” Beyond content, we see Humphrey using a brighter color palette and inserting vaguely figurative, whimsical patterns onto the surface. Yet, by the mid 1980s, the paintings return to a more ambiguous, abstract state.

Exhibitions
Since his first solo exhibition at the Tibor de Nagy Gallery in New York City in 1959, Humphrey's work has been the subject of 40 solo shows. During his lifetime, he had been represented by Green Gallery, Bykert Gallery, Andre Emmerich Gallery, Willard Gallery, and John Weber Gallery.

Solo exhibitions have continued to be mounted since his death in 1990, including Ralph Humphrey: Frame Paintings, 1964 to 1965 at Mary Boone Gallery, New York City, September 8–October 6, 1990 and Ralph Humphrey: Conveyance at Gary Snyder Gallery, April 2 – May 16, 2015. Other exhibitions have been held elsewhere in New York, San Francisco, Los Angeles, and Boston.

Humphrey's paintings have also been in group shows such as Systemic Painting at the Solomon R. Guggenheim Museum, New York, 1966, The Structure of Color at the Whitney Museum of American Art, New York, 1971, the 1979 Biennial at the Whitney Museum, and High Times, Hard Times: New York Painting, 1967–1975 at the Weatherspoon Art Museum, 2006.

Solo exhibitions
1959

Ralph Humphrey, Tibor de Nagy Gallery, New York, February 3–21
 
1960

Ralph Humphrey, Tibor de Nagy Gallery, New York, February 2–21
 
1961

Ralph Humphrey: Recent Paintings, Mayer Gallery, New York, March 14 – April 1
 
1965

Ralph Humphrey, Green Gallery, New York, May 5–29
 
1967

Ralph Humphrey, Bykert Gallery, New York, January 10 – February 24
 
1968

Ralph Humphrey, Bykert Gallery, New York, February 3–29
 
1969

Ralph Humphrey, Bykert Gallery, New York, February 1–27 Galerie Alfred Schmela, Düsseldorf
 
1970

Ralph Humphrey, Bykert Gallery, New York, April 4–25
 
1971

Ralph Humphrey, André Emmerich Gallery, New York, March 20 – April 8
 
1972

Ralph Humphrey, Bykert Gallery, New York, May 2–23
 
1973

Ralph Humphrey, Bykert Gallery, New York, May 12 – June 2
Ralph Humphrey: Survey of Paintings, Texas Gallery, Houston, May 15 – June 9
 
1974

Ralph Humphrey, Bykert Gallery, New York, April 20 – May 15
Ralph Humphrey: Paintings, Daniel Weinberg Gallery, San Francisco, November–December
 
1975

Ralph Humphrey: Paintings, 1974, Bykert Gallery, New York, February 4–26
Ralph Humphrey: Paintings, 1958–1966, Bykert/ Downtown, New York, February 4–26
 
1976

Ralph Humphrey, John Weber Gallery, New York, January 31 – February 25
 
1976–1977

Ralph Humphrey: Recent Paintings, Daniel Weinberg Gallery, San Francisco, December 16, 1976 – January 22, 1977
 
1977

Ralph Humphrey, John Weber Gallery, New York, February 9–26
 
1980

Ralph Humphrey, Willard Gallery, New York, April 5 – May 7
 
1982

Ralph Humphrey, Willard Gallery, New York, April 3–May 8
Ralph Humphrey: Paintings, 1975–1982, Daniel Weinberg Gallery, Los Angeles, October 6–30
 
1983

Ralph Humphrey: Selected Paintings, Daniel Weinberg Gallery, Los Angeles, May 14 – June 11
 
1984

Delahunty Gallery, Dallas
Ralph Humphrey, Willard Gallery, New York, April 7 – May 12
 
1985

Ralph Humphrey: Recent Paintings, Daniel Weinberg Gallery, Los Angeles, October 16 – November 2
 
1987

Ralph Humphrey, Jay Gorney Modern Art, New York, January–February
 
1990

Ralph Humphrey: 1990, Mary Boone Gallery, New York, March 3–31
Ralph Humphrey: Frame Paintings, 1964 to 1965, Mary Boone Gallery, New York, September 8–October 6
Ralph Humphrey: A Retrospective View, 1954–1990, Daniel Weinberg Gallery, Los Angeles, November 8– December 5
 
1991

Ralph Humphrey: The Late Paintings on Paper, Bertha and Karl Leubsdorf Art Gallery, Hunter College, City University of New York, September 19 – October 26
Ralph Humphrey: Paintings, 1975–1985, John Berggruen Gallery, San Francisco, October–November
 
1996

Ralph Humphrey: Selected Paintings, Daniel Weinberg Gallery, San Francisco, August 17 – October 17
 
1998

Ralph Humphrey, Danese Gallery, New York, January 16 – February 14
 
2000

Ralph Humphrey: Early Paintings, 1957–1967, Daniel Weinberg Gallery, Los Angeles, November 1 – December 9
 
2001

Ralph Humphrey: Later Paintings, 1975–1982, Daniel Weinberg Gallery, Los Angeles, April 5 – May 26
 
2008

Ralph Humphrey: Selected Works from the Estate, Nielsen Gallery, Boston, May 17 – June 14
Ralph Humphrey: Selected Paintings, 1957–1980, Daniel Weinberg Gallery, Los Angeles, May 31 – June 28
 
2012

Ralph Humphrey, Gary Snyder Gallery, New York, September 13 – October 27
 
2015

Ralph Humphrey: Conveyance, Garth Greenan Gallery, New York, April 2–May 16

Group exhibitions
1961
American Abstract Expressionists and Imagists, Solomon R. Guggenheim Museum, New York, October–December
 
1966
Systemic Painting, Solomon R. Guggenheim Museum, New York, September–November
 
1967
Selected N.Y.C. Artists 1967, Ithaca College Museum of Art, Ithaca, New York, April 4 – May 27
Focus on Light, New Jersey State Museum, Trenton, May 20 – September 10
Highlights of the 1966–1967 Art Season, Aldrich Museum of Contemporary Art, Ridgefield, Connecticut, June 18 – September 4
A Romantic Minimalism, Institute of Contemporary Art, Philadelphia September 13 – October 11
 
1968
Bykert Gallery, New York
The Art of the Real: USA, 1948–1968, Museum of Modern Art, New York, July 3 – September 8
 
1968–1969
The Pure and Clear: American Innovations, Philadelphia Museum of Art, November 13, 1968 – January 21, 1969
 
1969
American Painting: The 1960s, Georgia Museum of Art, University of Georgia, Athens, September 22– November 8
Current Minimal Painting, Vassar College Art Gallery, Poughkeepsie, New York
 
1969–1970
1969 Annual Exhibition: Contemporary American Painting, Whitney Museum of American Art, New York, December 16, 1969 – February 1, 1970
 
1970–1971
Color and Field, 1890–1970, Albright-Knox Art Gallery, Buffalo, September 15 – November 1, 1970; Dayton Art Institute, Ohio, November 20, 1970 – January 10, 1971; Cleveland Museum of Art, February 4–March 28, 1971
 
1971
The Structure of Color, Whitney Museum of American Art, New York, February 25 – April 18
Spray, Santa Barbara Museum of Art, California, April 24–May 30
Bykert Gallery, New York
Art of the Decade, 1960–1970: Paintings from the Collections of Greater Detroit, University Art Gallery, Oakland University, Rochester, Michigan, November 14–December 17
 
1972
Painting and Sculpture Today, Indianapolis Museum of Art, April 26 – June 4
Current American Abstract Painting, Vassar College Art Gallery, Poughkeepsie, New York
Dealers’ Choice, La Jolla Museum of Contemporary Art, California, July 15–September 27
 
1973
Drawings, Bykert Gallery, New York, January 6–24
Gallery Toselli, Milan
 
1974
New Painting: Stressing Surface, Katonah Gallery, Katonah, New York, May 4 – June 23
Painting and Sculpture Today, Indianapolis Museum of Art, May 22 – July 14; Taft Museum of Art, Cincinnati, September 12–October 24
Ten Painters in New York, Michael Walls Gallery, New York, June 15 – July 6
Seventy-First American Exhibition, Art Institute of Chicago, June 15 – August 11
 
1975
22 Artists, Susan Caldwell Gallery, New York, January 4–25
Fourteen Abstract Painters, Frederick S. Wight Art Gallery, University of California, Los Angeles, March 25 – May 25
Fourteen Artists, Baltimore Museum of Art, April 15 – June 1
A Group Show Selected by Klaus Kertess, Texas Gallery, Houston, September 15 – October 11
Douglas Drake Gallery, Kansas City, Missouri
 
1975–1976
Painting, Drawing, and Sculpture of the ’60s and ’70s from the Dorothy and Herbert Vogel Collection, Institute of Contemporary Art, Philadelphia, October 7–November 18, 1975; Contemporary Arts Center, Cincinnati, December 17, 1975 – February 15, 1976
 
1976
Ideas on Paper: 1970–1976, Renaissance Society at the University of Chicago, May 2 – June 6
Daniel Weinberg Gallery, San Francisco
 
1977
Paintings on Paper, Drawing Center, New York, January 15–26
Galerie Jean-Paul Najar, Paris
’75, ’76, ’77: Painting, Part I, Sarah Lawrence College Art Gallery, Bronxville, New York, February 19–March 10; American Foundation for the Arts, Miami, April–May; Contemporary Arts Center, Cincinnati, June–July
A View of a Decade, Museum of Contemporary Art, Chicago, September 10–November 10
John Weber Gallery, New York
 
1977–1978
Works from the Collection of Dorothy and Herbert Vogel, University of Michigan Museum of Art, Ann Arbor, November 11, 1977 – January 1, 1978
 
1978–1979
Late Twentieth Century Art from the Sydney and Frances Lewis Foundation, Anderson Gallery, Virginia Commonwealth University, Richmond, December 5, 1978 – January 9, 1979; Institute of Contemporary Art, University of Pennsylvania, Philadelphia, *March 22 – May 2, 1979
 
1979
1979 Biennial Exhibition, Whitney Museum of American Art, New York, February 6–April 1
Generation, Susan Caldwell Gallery, New York
The Reductive Object: A Survey of the Minimalist Aesthetic in the 1960s, Institute of Contemporary Art, Boston, March 7 – April 29
The Implicit Image: Abstract Painting in the ’70s, Nielsen Gallery, Boston, April 29 – June 1
Color and Structure, Hamilton Gallery, New York, May 5 – June 2
Texas Gallery, Houston
 
1980
Black, White, Other, R.H. Oosterom Gallery, New York, January 17 – February 17
Current/New York: Recent Works in Relief, Joe and Emily Lowe Art Gallery, Syracuse University, Syracuse, New York, January 27–February 24
Painting in Relief, Whitney Museum of American Art, Downtown Branch, New York, January 30 – March 5
Painting and Sculpture Today, Indianapolis Museum of Art, June 24 – August 17
3 Dimensional Painting, Museum of Contemporary Art, Chicago, August 2 – November 9
Planar Painting: Constructs, 1975–1980, The Alternative Museum, New York, October 18–November 15, 1980
The Image Transformed, Art Latitude Gallery, New York, November 4–29
 
1981
A Seventies Selection: An Exhibition of Works from the Collection of the Whitney Museum of American Art, Miami University Art Museum, Oxford, Ohio, February 14 – June 14
Abstract Mythologies, Nielsen Gallery, Boston, March 1–31
Between Painting and Sculpture, Pam Adler Gallery, New York, March 31 – April 25
 
1981–1982
Drawing Invitational 1981, Harm Bouckaert Gallery, New York, December 2, 1981 – January 2, 1982
 
1982
The Erotic Impulse, Roger Litz Gallery, New York
Postminimalism, Aldrich Museum of Contemporary Art, Ridgefield, Connecticut, September 19–December 19
 
1983
Abstract Painting: 1960–1969, P.S. 1 Contemporary Art Center, Queens, January 16 – March 13
New Work, New York: Newcastle Salutes New York, Newcastle Polytechnic Gallery, Newcastle upon Tyne, United Kingdom, October 8–November 4
 
1984
Parasol and Simca: Two Presses/Two Processes, Center Gallery, Bucknell University, Lewisburg, Pennsylvania, February 3–April 4, 1984; Sordoni Art Gallery, Wilkes College, Wilkes-Barre, Pennsylvania, April 15–May 13
The Meditative Surface, Renaissance Society at the University of Chicago, April 1 – May 16
 
1985
Abstract Painting Redefined, Louis K. Meisel Gallery, New York, February 16 – March 30
Now and Then: A Selection of Recent and Earlier Paintings, Daniel Weinberg Gallery, Los Angeles, June 1 – August 31
American Abstract Painting: 1960–1980, Margo Leavin Gallery, Los Angeles, June 19 – August 24
 
1986
The Purist Image, Marian Locks Gallery, Philadelphia, November
 
1986–1987
The Window in Twentieth-Century Art, Neuberger Museum of Art, Purchase College, State University of New York, September 21, 1986 – January 18, 1987; Contemporary Arts Museum, Houston, April 24– June 29, 1987
 
1997
A Lasting Legacy: Selections from the Lannan Foundation Gift, Museum of Contemporary Art, Los Angeles, September 9–December 14
 
2004
A Minimal Future?: Art as Object, 1958–1968, Museum of Contemporary Art, Los Angeles, March 28 – July 26
 
2006–2007
High Times, Hard Times: New York Painting, 1967–1975, Weatherspoon Art Museum, University of North Carolina, Greensboro, August 6–October 15, 2006; American University Museum at the Katzen Arts Center, American University, Washington, D.C., November 21, 2006 – January 21, 2007; National Academy Museum and School, New York, February 13 – April 27, 2007
 
2008
The Idea of Nature, 33 Bond Gallery, New York, June 12–July 31
Into the Void: Abstract Art, 1948–2008, Tucson Museum of Art, July 17–September 26
 
2008–2009
Steve DiBenedetto, Ralph Humphrey, Chris Martin, and Andrew Masullo/Paintings, Daniel Weinberg Gallery, Los Angeles, December 6, 2008 – January 31, 2009
 
2009
Image Matter, Mary Boone Gallery, New York, February 21 – March 28
Not New: Vincent Fecteau Selects from the Collection, San Francisco Museum of Modern Art, July 25 – November 8
 
2010
Wall-to-Wall, Daniel Weinberg Gallery, Los Angeles, June 5 – August 14
 
2011
Surface Truths: Abstract Painting in the Sixties, Norton Simon Museum, Pasadena, California, March 25 – August 15
 
2011–2012
The Language of Less: Then and Now, Museum of Contemporary Art, Chicago, October 8, 2011 – April 8, 2012
 
2012
Susan Hartnett, Ralph Humphrey, Marilyn Lerner, and Dona Nelson, Mary Boone Gallery, New York, March 22 – April 28
 
2014–2015
The Avant-Garde Collection, Orange County Museum of Art, Newport Beach, California, September 7, 2014 – January 4, 2015
 
2015
Pretty Raw: After and Around Helen Frankenthaler, Rose Art Museum, Brandeis University, Waltham, Massachusetts, February 11 – June 7, 2015

Collections
Humphrey's work can be found in prominent collections in America and Australia, including the following:
Addison Gallery of American Art 
Allen Memorial Art Museum 
Art Institute of Chicago 
Butler Institute of American Art
Carnegie Museum of Art 
Dayton Art Institute
Museum of Contemporary Art, Chicago 
Museum of Contemporary Art, Los Angeles 
Museum of Contemporary Art, San Diego
Museum of Fine Arts, Boston
Museum of Fine Arts, Houston 
Museum of Modern Art 
National Gallery of Australia
Norton Simon Museum 
Oklahoma City Museum of Art
Orange County Museum of Art
Palm Springs Art Museum
Parrish Art Museum
Pérez Art Museum Miami
Philadelphia Museum of Art 
Rose Art Museum
San Francisco Museum of Modern Art 
Smithsonian American Art Museum 
Tucson Museum of Art
Virginia Museum of Fine Arts
Walker Art Center 
Weatherspoon Art Museum
Whitney Museum of American Art

References

External links 
 Ralph Humphrey on Artsy

American abstract artists
20th-century American painters
American male painters
Painters from Ohio
1990 deaths
1937 births
Artists from Youngstown, Ohio
Youngstown State University alumni
Painters from New York City
20th-century American male artists